Pacesetter Propeller Works, Limited was an American manufacturer of propellers for homebuilt and ultralight aircraft. The company headquarters was located in Hillsboro, Oregon.

The company produced propellers that have been used on Van's Aircraft RV-3s, RV-4s, RV-6s, Glasairs, Mustang Aeronautics Mustang IIs, Mustang Aeronautics Midget Mustangs and Thorpe T-18s.

See also
List of aircraft propeller manufacturers

References 

Aircraft propeller manufacturers
Aerospace companies of the United States
Companies based in Hillsboro, Oregon
Defunct companies based in Oregon